The American College of Obstetricians and Gynecologists  (ACOG) is a professional association of physicians specializing in obstetrics and gynecology in the United States. Several Latin American countries are also represented within Districts of the organization. It is a 501(c)(3) organization with a membership of more than 60,000 obstetrician-gynecologists and women's health care professionals. It was founded in 1951.


Background 
A companion 501(c)(6) organization, the American Congress of Obstetricians and Gynecologists, was founded in 2008 and became operational in 2010. The two organizations coexist, and member individuals automatically belong to both. Both are not-for-profit. The College as a 501(c)(3) focuses on education (with limited political work), whereas the Congress as a 501(c)(6) is allowed to advocate for members' interests in terms of the business of medicine (BOM) through lobbying and other political work. Their main advocacy focuses on women's reproductive health, specifically opposing political interference in abortion access.
Physician members are referred to as fellows and use the post-nominal letters FACOG to indicate their status. To become a fellow, a candidate must become certified by the American Board of Obstetrics and Gynecology, an independent organization, and then nominated to the College by another fellow. Non ObGyn professionals may join as an Allied Health Professional, but must meet their standards of education.

Obstetrics & Gynecology is the official publication of ACOG. It is popularly known as "The Green Journal".  In 1986, the organization successfully challenged an anti-abortion law in Pennsylvania before the U.S. Supreme Court in Thornburgh v. American College of Obstetricians and Gynecologists.

References

External links
 Official ACOG website
 Green Journal website

1951 establishments in the United States
Abortion-rights organizations in the United States
Medical associations based in the United States
Medical and health organizations based in Washington, D.C.
Obstetrics and gynaecology organizations
Organizations established in 1951